The 2013 Superbike World Championship was the twenty-sixth season of the Superbike World Championship. It began on 24 February at Phillip Island and finished on 20 October at the Circuito de Jerez after 14 rounds.

The season saw the number of riders per row on the starting grid reduced from four to three; the knockout system in use for Superpole was revised as the number of riders admitted to the first and to the third session changed from sixteen to fifteen and from eight to nine respectively. In addition, pit stops with tyre changes were introduced in order to avoid races to be interrupted due to variable weather conditions.

Tom Sykes was crowned champion after obtaining the third-place finish he needed to secure the title victory at Jerez.

Race calendar and results
The provisional race schedule was publicly announced by the FIM on 6 October 2012 with fourteen confirmed rounds and one other round pending confirmation. On 15 January 2013 the Indian round was moved from 10 March to 17 November.

On 8 March 2013, the FIM issued a definitive calendar, confirming rounds at Portimão and Imola that were previously subject to contract, as well as introducing a round at Istanbul Park in September to complete a 15-round calendar. On 14 August 2013, the Indian round was cancelled due to "operational challenges" at the Buddh International Circuit. The races at Mazda Raceway Laguna Seca were held on two days; one race on Saturday, and one race on Sunday.

Footnotes

Championship standings

Riders' championship

Manufacturers' championship

Entry list

All entries used Pirelli tyres.

References

External links

 
Superbike World Championship seasons
World